Cut may refer to:

Common uses
 The act of cutting, the separation of an object into two through acutely-directed force
 A type of wound
 Cut (archaeology), a hole dug in the past
 Cut (clothing), the style or shape of a garment
 Cut (earthworks), an excavation to make way for a transport route
 Cut (etiquette), a snub or slight such as failure to greet an acquaintance
 Cut (gems)
 Cut of meat
 Cutting agent, a diluent used to dilute illicit drugs

Geography
 Cut, Alba, Romania
 Cut, Texas, an unincorporated community in Houston County, Texas
 Cut, a village in Dumbrava Roșie, Neamț County, Romania
 Cut River (Mackinac County, Michigan)
 Cut River (Roscommon County, Michigan)
 Cutral Có Airport, Argentina (IATA code CUT)
 Cuts, Oise, France

Computing and mathematics
 Cut (logic programming)
 cut (Unix), a command line utility
 Cut, copy, and paste, a set of editing procedures
 Control Unit Terminal, a kind of IBM display terminal for mainframe computers
 Cut (graph theory)
 Branch cut, a concept in complex analysis
 Cut-elimination theorem
 Dedekind cut, a partition of rational numbers

Books
 Cut (manga), a 2008 Japanese manga
 Cut (novel), by Patricia McCormick

Films and television 
 Cut (censorship), removal of a scene to meet censors' requirements
 Cut (transition), a transition from one sequence to another
 Cut (2000 film), a horror comedy film
 Cut (2011 film), a Japanese drama film
 Cut (advertisement), a 2009 British advertising campaign on domestic violence
 Cuts (TV series), a 2005 TV series

Games and sport
 Cut (cards), a method of mixing a deck of cards
 Cut (golf), a means of reducing the number of competitors in a golf tournament; also, a type of stroke intended to induce a particular ball flight

Music
 Cut (music), an African-American music technique
 Cut drum
 Cut_, a one-off solo/band effort by Ray Wilson, which released Millionairhead in 2000

Albums
 Cut (C-Tec album), 2000
 Cut (Crack the Sky album), 1998
 Cut (EP), a 2014 EP by Aaron Yan
 Cut (Golden Earring album), 1982
 Cut (Hunters and Collectors album), 1992
 Cut (The Slits album), 1979
 Cut, an album by Flare Acoustic Arts League
Cut, 1982 album by Adrian Snell
 Cuts (album), an album by Merzbow, Balázs Pándi and Mats Gustafsson
 Cuts (EP), a 1992 EP by L.A. Guns

Songs
 "Cut" (Plumb song), 2006
 "Cut", a song by The Cure on the album Wish
 "Cut", a song by iamnot on the album Whoami
 "Cut", a song by No One from No One

Abbreviations
 Carleton Ultimate Team
 Coordinated Universal Time, a time standard; the official abbreviation is "UTC".
 Cryptic unstable transcript, a type of RNA molecule
 Cincinnati Union Terminal
 Cleveland Union Terminal
 Compact Utility Tractor
 Campaign for Unmetered Telecommunications, or CUT, a UK political pressure group
 Church Universal and Triumphant, a religious movement
 Candidatura Unitaria de Trabajadores (Unitarian Candidacy of Workers)
 Chung Uk Tsuen stop, Hong Kong; MTR station code

Schools
 Central University of Technology, South Africa
 Chalmers University of Technology, Sweden
 Chinhoyi University of Technology, Zimbabwe
 Curtin University of Technology, Australia
 Cyprus University of Technology, Cyprus

Trade unions
 Central Única dos Trabalhadores, in Brazil
 Central Unitaria de Traballadores in Galicia, Spain
 Central Unitaria de Trabajadores de Chile (Workers' United Center of Chile)
 Confederación Unitaria de Trabajadores (Costa Rica)
 Confederación Unitaria de Trabajadores del Perú

See also
 Cut and paste (disambiguation)
 Cut-out (disambiguation)
 Cutaway (disambiguation)
 Cutter (disambiguation)
 Cutting (disambiguation)
 Cutoff (disambiguation)
 CUTS (disambiguation)
 The Cut (disambiguation)